The Kremlin Cup is an annual pool tournament held in the Olympic Stadium in Moscow, Russia which has been held since 2011. Ruslan Chinachov has won the most times, winning the event in both 2014 and 2015. The tournament takes place in parallel to a Russian pyramid event of the same name also held in Moscow. The event was a nine-ball tournament in the inaugural 2011 edition, but changed to ten-ball in 2012.

Winners

Top Performers

References 

Pool competitions
Cue sports in Russia
International sports competitions hosted by Russia
Sports competitions in Moscow
September sporting events
2011 establishments in Russia
Recurring sporting events established in 2011
Kremlin Cup (pool)